Yahya ibn Asad (died 855) was a Samanid ruler of Shash (819–855) and Samarkand (851/852–855). He was a son of Asad.

In 819, Yahya was granted authority over the city of Shash by Caliph Al-Ma'mun's governor of Khurasan, Ghassan ibn 'Abbad, as reward for his support against the rebel Rafi' ibn Laith. Following the death of his brother Nuh, who ruled in Samarkand, Yahya and another brother Ahmad were given rule over the city by Abdallah, the governor of Khurasan. Yahya's power was subsequently significantly curtailed by Ahmad, and he may have ruled as simply a figurehead until his death in 855. Yahya's line was then superseded by Ahmad's.

Sources
 

855 deaths
Samanids
9th-century monarchs in Asia
Year of birth unknown
9th-century Iranian people